Thomas D. Weidley is a United States Marine Corps major general who most recently served as the Assistant Chief of Staff for Strategic Planning and Policy of the United Nations Command, ROK/US Combined Forces Command, and United States Forces Korea. Previously, he served as the Commander of the 1st Marine Aircraft Wing.

Born in Lima, Pennsylvania, Weidley earned a B.S. degree in mechanical engineering from Ohio Northern University in 1987. After flight training, he was designated a naval aviator in July 1989. Weidley later received an M.A. degree in national security and strategic studies from the Naval War College in June 2004.

Weidley received administrative action as a result of an investigation into a mid-air collision between an F/A-18 and KC-130J in December 2018. In November 2021, Weidley became the chief operating officer at the engineering aviation company Capewell.

References

External links

Year of birth missing (living people)
Living people
People from Middletown Township, Delaware County, Pennsylvania
Ohio Northern University alumni
United States Naval Aviators
Naval War College alumni
Recipients of the Legion of Merit
United States Marine Corps generals
Military personnel from Pennsylvania